The Freccia-class destroyer was a class of destroyers built for the  (Royal Italian Navy) in the 1930s. Four modified ships were built and delivered in 1933 for Greece.

Ships

Italian Navy
 
Built by Odero, Sestri Ponente
launched 6 September 1930, completed 25 January 1932 
Captured by the Germans and renamed TA31. Scuttled on 24 April 1945.
  
Built by CT Riva Trigioso
launched 3 August 1930, completed 21 October 1931
In the Spanish Civil War, on 15 August 1937, she shelled, torpedoed and disabled the Panamanian tanker George McKnight off Tunis.
Sunk on 8 August 1943 off Genoa by bombing.
  
Built by CT Riva Trigioso
launched 17 January 1932, completed 10 May 1932
In the Spanish Civil War, on 11 August 1937, she torpedoed and sank the Spanish Republican tanker Campeador in the strait of Sicily.
Sunk by a mine on 3 February 1943 with the loss of 170 men including Lt. Cdr. Enea Picchio, the commanding officer, while 39 men survived.
  
Built by Odero, Sestri Ponente
launched 26 March 1931, completed 6 February 1932 
Rammed and sank UK submarine  on 14 June 1940. Beached herself on 21 June 1942 near Cape Bon and was finished off by torpedoes from the submarine .

Hellenic Navy
The Greek Navy ordered four destroyers from Italy in 1929 to a modified design as the Kountouriotis class. The chief difference with the Italian ships was the substitution of four single 120 mm guns (Ansaldo Model 1926) for the twin turrets used in the Italian Navy ships.

Built by Odero, Sestri Ponente
launched 21 October 1931, commissioned November 1932
Sunk by German aircraft, 22 April 1941.

Built by Odero, Sestri Ponente
commissioned May 1933
Served in World War II, decommissioned in 1946, Scrapped 1947.

Built by Odero, Sestri Ponente
commissioned May 1933 
Sunk by German aircraft, 20 April 1941.

Built by Odero, Sestri Ponente
launched 29 August 1931, commissioned November 1932
Served in World War II, decommissioned and scrapped in 1946.

The two surviving ships, Spetsai and Kountouriotis, served in the Eastern Mediterranean as part of the Free Greek Navy until late 1943. They were then laid up at Port Said, Egypt for want of Italian spare parts, and because their crews were needed for new ships built in the UK for the Free Greek Navy.

Notes

Bibliography

External links
 Freccia (1930)  Marina Militare website

Destroyer classes